The Hotel Grande Bretagne is a luxury hotel in Athens, Greece.  It is located on Syntagma Square, on the corner of Vasileos Georgiou A' and Panepistimiou Streets. It is owned presently by Lampsa Hellenic Hotels.

History

The original structure was built during 1842 as a house for Antonis Dimitriou, a wealthy Greek businessman from the island of Lemnos, twelve years after independence of Greece from the Ottoman Empire.  In 1874, it was bought by Efstathios Lampsas, who restored it with an 800,000 drachma loan and named it "Grande Bretagne." By 1888, the hotel had electricity installed. In November 1930, a new wing on Panepistimiou Street was inaugurated, and in 1950, another wing on Voukourestiou Street. In 1957, Dimitriou's mansion was demolished and a new wing was built on its place. The architect Kostas Voutsinas and the owners retained some of the style of the original building.

During the Greco-Italian War and the Battle of Greece in 1940–41, the hotel housed the Greek General Headquarters. 
During the Axis occupation, the hotel served as Nazi headquarters. When the Axis withdrew from Greece, in 1944, British forces made it their headquarters.

During the early stages of the Greek Civil War, the hotel housed Prime Minister Georgios Papandreou, the Council of Ministers, and the British military assistance force under General Ronald Scobie.

During 2003, the Grande Bretagne underwent a €112-million renovation. The hotel has 320 rooms and suites, including a 400 square metre (4,305 sqf.) suite on the fifth floor. The hotel also has a roof garden restaurant.

In January 2023, the hotel housed numerous European royals who were arriving in Athens the funeral of Constantine II of Greece.

References

External links

Hotel Grande Bretagne official website
LAMPSA HELLENIC HOTELS S.A. official website
Hotels of Greece: Grande Bretagne

Houses completed in 1842
1878 establishments in Greece
Grande Bretagne
Grande Bretagne
Theophil Hansen buildings